The Atlas of the Dragonlance World by Karen Wynn Fonstad provides a cartographer's illustrated point of view to the fictional world known as "Krynn" from the Dragonlance setting created by Tracy Hickman and Margaret Weis. This 168-page perfect-bound book was published in 1987.

Reviews
 Casus Belli #42 (Dec 1987)
 Fantasy Worlds (Issue 3 - Dec 1987)

References

1987 books
Dragonlance World